The 1990 Tokyo Indoor, also known by its sponsored name Seiko Super Tennis, was a men's tennis tournament played on indoor carpet courts at the Yoyogi National Gymnasium in Tokyo, Japan that was part of the 1990 ATP Tour and was an ATP Championship Series event, today known as the ATP World Tour 500 series. The tournament was held from 8 October through 14 October 1990. Matches were the best of three sets. Third-seeded Ivan Lendl won the singles title.

Finals

Singles

 Ivan Lendl defeated  Boris Becker 4–6, 6–3, 7–6(7–5)
 It was Lendl's 5th singles title of the year and the 88th of his career.

Doubles

 Guy Forget /  Jakob Hlasek defeated  Scott Davis /  David Pate 7–6, 7–5

References

External links
 ITF tournament edition details

Tokyo Indoor
Tokyo Indoor
Tokyo Indoor